Henrietta Paulet, Duchess of Bolton ( Crofts;  – 27 February 1730), was the third wife of Charles Paulet, 2nd Duke of Bolton.

The elder daughter of James Scott, 1st Duke of Monmouth, by his mistress Eleanor Needham, Henrietta took the surname of "Crofts" that had been assumed by her father when he was in the care of the Crofts baronets. Her mother's sister, Jane Myddelton, was one of the celebrated Windsor Beauties.

Henrietta married the Duke of Bolton in Dublin in about 1697, some years after the death of his second wife, Frances. She was around twenty years his junior, and he was known in society as ‘a most lewd, vicious man, a great dissembler and a very hard drinker’. They had one son:
Lord Nassau Powlett (1698-1741), who married Isabella Tufton, daughter of Thomas Tufton, 6th Earl of Thanet, and had one daughter.

From 1714 to 1717, the duchess was a Lady of the Bedchamber to the Princess of Wales, Caroline of Ansbach. 

Following the Jacobite Rebellion of 1715, Henrietta interceded, unsuccessfully, with King George I on behalf of her friend Anna Radclyffe, Countess of Derwentwater, whose husband, James, the 3rd Earl, was condemned to death for his role in the rebellion.

She was one of the aristocratic female signatories to Thomas Coram's petition to establish the Foundling Hospital, which was presented to King George II in 1735. She signed the petition on 25 April 1729, and Gillian Wagner suggests that the Bolton family members may have signed as a result of their 'personal experience of illegitimacy in the[ir] family'. Wagner also suggests that the Dowager Duchess signed with the encouragement of her step-daughter-in-law Anne, who had signed Coram's petition three days earlier, on 22 April 1729.

Her portrait, by Sir Godfrey Kneller, is held by the Art Gallery of South Australia; the Royal Collection has a mezzotint copy and a watercolour miniature.

Henrietta died in 1730, leaving no will, and was buried on 10 March of that year at Basing.
Henrietta Street in Dublin may have been named after her (it intersects with Bolton Street, named after her husband), although some think it is named after Henrietta FitzRoy, Duchess of Grafton.

References

1680s births
1730 deaths
English duchesses by marriage
Henrietta
18th-century philanthropists
Burials in Hampshire
17th-century English nobility
17th-century English women
18th-century English nobility
18th-century English women
English women philanthropists
Court of George I of Great Britain
Household of Caroline of Brandenburg-Ansbach
18th-century women philanthropists
Wives of knights